Hao Ran (Chinese: 浩然; 1932 – February 20, 2008) was the pen name of Liang Jinguang, a modern Chinese writer. He was the only author who published novels during the Cultural Revolution era. His work Sunny Days was praised by Jiang Qing. In 1977, he joined the Revolutionary Committee of Beijing. His autobiography was published in 2000.

Works
 《金光大道》.The Golden Road 1972

References

1957 births
2008 deaths
People from Tangshan
Short story writers from Hebei
20th-century Chinese novelists
Chinese male novelists
20th-century Chinese short story writers
Chinese male short story writers
20th-century Chinese male writers
People's Republic of China short story writers